Valcárcel is a surname. Notable people with the surname include:

Alejandro Rodríguez de Valcárcel (1917–1976), Francoist Spanish politician
Kitín Muñoz y Valcárcel (born 1958), Spanish navigator, scientist and sociological explorer
Aurelio Valcárcel Carroll, television producer and director associated with the Telemundo television network
Carlos Valcárcel (born 1981), boxer from Puerto Rico, competitor at the 2000 Summer Olympics in Sydney, Australia
Eleazar Huerta Valcárcel (1903–1974), Spanish lawyer and politician
Gisela Valcárcel (born 1963), Peruvian television hostess, actress and businesswoman
Ramón Luis Valcárcel (born 1954), Spanish politician, president of the Autonomous Community of the Region of Murcia from 1995

See also
Valcarcelia
Balcarce
Valcele